A split sharp is a kind of key found in some early keyboard instruments, such as the harpsichord, clavichord, or organ. It is a musical key divided in two, with separately depressible front and back sections, each sounding its own pitch. The particular keys that were split were those that play the sharps and flats on the standard musical keyboard (the "black keys" on a modern piano).

Split sharps served two distinct purposes. First, in the broken octave, they allowed an instrument to include deep bass notes while retaining a short, compact keyboard.

Second, in older music, tuning was generally not done by equal temperament, which treats note pairs such as A and B as the same pitch. Instead, they were assigned slightly different pitches on enharmonic keyboards (particularly in "meantone temperament"). This allowed certain musical intervals, such as the major third, to sound closer to their ideal just value, hence  more closely tuned to just intonation.

Split sharps present advantages and disadvantages: "Obviously this would have its advantages under some circumstances in terms of intonation. However, the complexities of fingering and hand position dictated by such a keyboard configuration presented problems." Specifically: "Such devices were obviously an impediment to rapid scale work in the lowest bass register, but this does not matter greatly as Italian seventeenth-century music generally avoids writing of this kind."

In modern usage, split sharps are usually the method of choice for custom keyboards that play 19 equal temperament, which, like meantone, uses different pitches for sharps and flats that are enharmonic in the standard 12 tone.

Notes

References

Further reading
Kottick, Edward L. and George Lucktenberg (1997) Early keyboard instruments in European museums. Bloomington: Indiana University Press.

Musical keyboard layouts
Musical tuning